Barod is a town in Kota district, Rajasthan, India. Barod is situated near the bank of River "Kali Sindh". It is 56 km far from Coaching City. Barod is a beautiful town and its population is about 18,000.

References

Villages in Kota district